Thank Your for Your Service may refer to:

Thank You for Your Service (book), 2013 non-fiction book
Thank You for Your Service (2015 film), American documentary
Thank You for Your Service (2017 film), American biographical war drama based on the book
We Got It from Here... Thank You 4 Your Service, 2016 album by American hip hop group A Tribe Called Quest
 "Thank You for Your Service" (American Horror Story), an episode of the eleventh season of American Horror Story